Baliochila collinsi is a butterfly in the family Lycaenidae. It is found in south-eastern Tanzania. Its habitat consists of montane forests.

Adults have been recorded on wing in February and March.

References

Butterflies described in 2004
Poritiinae
Endemic fauna of Tanzania
Butterflies of Africa